Bob Schneider (born October 12, 1965) is an Austin, Texas–based musician and former lead singer of the rock band Ugly Americans. He has released around a dozen albums, mostly on his own Shockorama label. Lonelyland (2001) was licensed through Universal Records, while in 2005 distribution deal with Vanguard Records saw his albums made widely available. In 2009 he signed to Kirtland Records and put out Lovely Creatures, A Perfect Day, and Burden of Proof. His record The King Kong Suite was released on Shockorama Records in 2015.

Early life 
Schneider was born in Ypsilanti, Michigan to Bob Sr. and Katie Schneider (a teacher) and raised in El Paso and Munich, Germany together with his sister. The son of an opera singer, he moved with his parents to Germany when he was two, while his father received instruction from noted vocal teachers. It led to a marginal existence as “my parents had this big plan, but my dad just didn’t have the voice". He learned guitar and piano at an early age, and performed at his parents' parties.

Before performing solo, he performed for years in various bands. He dropped out of the University of Texas at El Paso where he studied art, while performing in his first band, a funk-rock outfit called Joe Rockhead. The band independently released three albums before disbanding. Schneider subsequently performed with Ugly Americans who were an opening act for the Dave Matthews Band and signed with the revived Capricorn Records. In 1997, Schneider co-founded The Scabs, a funk ensemble that regularly played in around Austin and described as " inspired by The Rugburns (right down to the suits and ties) [with] bawdy show tunes and puerile blues in the beginning, but eventually the powerhouse funk took over when the Grooveline Horns were added".

Career 
In 1999, Schneider formed a solo act, initially under the name Lonelyland, which became the title of his record released through Universal Records. His style has been described as "acoustic based songs with electronic beats and noises in the background (..) and other types of cross genre music. His live shows are known for improvisation [and] audience involvement".

He went on to record the major-label solo albums Lonelyland (2001) and I'm Good Now (2004), which garnered him significantly more national attention and some critical acclaim. "Big Blue Sea" from the Lonelyland album received significant radio play, as did "Come With Me Tonight" from I'm Good Now. "Metal & Steel" from Lonelyland is, to date, Schneider's most played song.

The contracts that he signed with Universal in 2001 and Vanguard in 2004 allowed him to release albums as "side projects" on his own Shockorama Records. Among the albums that have been self-released are Galaxy Kings and I've Seen The End of the World and It Looks Like This. All of these side projects were re-released by Vanguard in conjunction with the release of his 2006 album The Californian. Previously, these albums had limited availability as approximately 10,000 copies were produced. After releasing The Californian, Schneider also put out Greatest Hits Live, recorded in Austin on July 17, 2006, on Shockorama Records. He has a long-standing Monday night residency at the Saxon Pub and regularly plays at Antone's, both venues in Austin. His live-band includes Harmoni Kelley (bass), Jeff Plankenhorn (guitars), Conrad Choucroun (drums), Danny Levin (cello) and Oliver Steck (accordion).

In 2009, Schneider signed with Kirtland Records and released Lovely Creatures in September 2009. It featured the single "40 Dogs (Like Romeo and Juliet)", which peaked at #14 on the AAA Radio Chart. The album also featured Patty Griffin on the track "Changing Your Mind". He released a second album on the label entitled "A Perfect Day" on April 19, 2011, featuring the single "Let The Light In." "Burden of Proof" was released on June 11, 2013.

His next musical project, King Kong, was released in 2015 under the Shockorama label and was the result of a crowdsourcing campaign through PledgeMusic.  King Kong saw its release over the course of 2015 in the form of three EPs (volumes collectively known as The King Kong Suite) as well as a full-length album made available to his online backers. In 2017, Schneider began making his massive backlog of recorded demos available to his fans through Patreon. His next album Blood and Bones was released on June 8, 2018.

On an episode of The Lone Star Plate podcast, Schneider said he turned down a part in the 2020 Netflix hit The Lost Husband because he didn't want to become an on-screen celebrity.

Soundtrack contributions 
2000 – "Blue Skies for Everyone" was played during the opening sequence of the movie "Gun Shy," starring Liam Neeson and Sandra Bullock.
2000 – "Bullets" was used in the movie "Miss Congeniality," starring Sandra Bullock.
2001 – "Bullets" also appeared on the "Jay & Silent Bob Strike Back" soundtrack
2002 – "Big Blue Sea" was used in the movie "40 Days and 40 Nights," starring Josh Hartnett
2002 – "The World Exploded Into Love" appeared in the movie "Secrets of the Ya-Ya Sisterhood," starring Sandra Bullock
2006 – "The World Exploded Into Love" closed out the first episode of the television sitcom "Men in Trees," starring Anne Heche.
2009 – "Love Is Everywhere" is featured in the film and soundtrack of the movie "All About Steve," starring Sandra Bullock
2009 – "Changing Your Mind" is featured in the indie film "Harmony and Me," where he also has a role as a wedding singer
2019 - “Bombanaza” (instrumental version) is featured during the closing credits for the Quentin Tarantino documentary, QT8: The First Eight.
2020 - "Wish the Wind Would Blow Me" and "The World Exploded Into Love" are both featured in the film "The Lost Husband," starring Josh Duhamel

Awards 
Bob Schneider has won 55 Austin Music Awards, to date, for multiple different projects ranging from 1992 to 2017.

Austin Music Awards 
 1992: Best Funk Band, Joe Rock Head
 1993: Best New Band, Ugly Americans; Best Funk Band, Ugly Americans
 1994: Best Funk Band, Ugly Americans
 1995: Best Funk Band, Ugly Americans
 1996: Best Pop Band, Ugly Americans; Best Soul/Funk Band, Ugly Americans
 1998: Best Funk Band, The Scabs; Best None of the Above Band, Bob Schneider and Lonelyland
 1999: Musician of the Year, Best Male Vocals, Best Songwriter, Band of the Year – The Scabs; Best Alternative/Punk Band, The Scabs; Best Funk Band, The Scabs; Best Concert Poster, Bob Schneider/Joe Rockhead
 2000: Musician of the Year, Album of the Year, Lonelyland; Best Male Vocals, Best Songwriter, Best Singer-Songwriter, Best Funk Band – The Scabs; Best Concert Poster, Bob Schneider/The Scabs; Best Album Artwork, Lonelyland
 2001: Musician of the Year, Best Male Vocals, Best Songwriter, Best Singer-Songwriter
 2003: Musician of the Year 
 2004: Album of the Year, I'm Good Now; Song of the Year, "Cap'n Kirk"
 2007: Best Bluegrass Band, Bob Schneider and Texas Bluegrass Massacre
 2008: Band of the Year, Bob Schneider and Lonelyland; Best Male Vocals, Best Bluegrass Band – Bob Schneider and Texas Bluegrass Massacre
 2009: Musician of the Year, Album of the Year – Lovely Creatures; Song of the Year, "40 Dogs"; Band of the Year, Bob Schneider and Lonelyland; Best Male Vocals, Best Songwriter 
 2010: Best Male Vocals
 2013: Musician of the Year, Album of the Year – Burden of Proof; Best Songwriter
 2015: Musician of the Year, Best Songwriter, Best Male Vocals, Album of the Year – King Kong; Song of the Year, "Stars Over Your House"; Best Residency, Bob Schneider's Lonelyland; Best Album Artwork,King Kong; Best Poster, Bob Schneider/King Kong
 2016: Best Residency, Bob Schneider's Lonelyland; Best Rock Band, Bob Schneider and Lonelyland

Discography 
Bob Schneider
Songs Sung and Played on Guitar at the Same Time (1998)
Lonelyland (2000-Shockorama) & (2001-Universal)
Underneath the Onion Trees (2000)
The Galaxy Kings (2002)
I Have Seen the End of the World and It Looks Like This (2003)
I'm Good Now (2004)
The Californian (2006)
Greatest Hits Live (2006)
Songs Sung & Played at the Same Time with People in the Room (2007)
When the Sun Breaks Down on the Moon (2007)
Love Is Everywhere EP (2009)
Lovely Creatures (2009)
Live At The Paramount Theatre (2009)
Christmastime (2009)
A Perfect Day (2011)
Burden of Proof (2013)
The King Kong Suite (2015)
I Will Find You No Matter What: The Songs of Luc & Bob Schneider (2016) (Released as "The L")
Blood and Bones (2018)
In A Roomful Of Blood With A Sleeping Tiger (2021)

Charting albums

The Scabs
Freebird (1998)
Bombtracks (1998)
More Than a Feeling (1999)
Destroyer (2000)

Ugly Americans
Ugly Americans (1993)
Ugly Americans (Live) (1994)
Stereophonic Spanish Fly (1996)
Boom Boom Baby (1998)

Joe Rockhead
Party Till You're Dead (1991)
Crazy (1992)
No Going Back (1992)

Frunk 
Almost every one of Schneider's live show are recorded by his sound engineer Jay Thomas and made available for purchase. Originally available only as a double-disc set sold after each performance, Bob began to make and continues to make these recordings (dubbed "Frunk") available for purchase through his website in early 2009. The double-disc sets were gradually phased out throughout 2010/2011.

Books

See also 
Music of Austin

References

External links

 

Living people
1965 births
Musicians from Munich
Musicians from Austin, Texas
People from Ypsilanti, Michigan
University of Texas at El Paso alumni